"The Vacant Chair" is a poem that was written following the death of John William Grout (July 25, 1843 – October 21, 1861). Grout was a soldier killed in the American Civil War during the Battle of Ball's Bluff. The poem, written by Henry S. Washburn was put to music by George Frederick Root and became a popular song of the post-Civil War era.

John William Grout

John William Grout was born to Jonathan and Mary Jane Grout on July 25, 1843, at Worcester, Massachusetts. He attended the military academy there.

He served as a 2nd lieutenant of Company D, 15th Massachusetts Infantry and was killed at the age of eighteen in the Battle of Ball’s Bluff on October 21, 1861. Grout's body was recovered on November 5, 1861, after being washed  back to Washington, D.C. His remains were identified by the name written on his clothing.

Poem

Upon hearing of Grout's death, Henry Stevenson Washburn, a family friend, wrote "The Vacant Chair" in late 1861, and it was first published in the Worcester Spy, attributed to "H. S. W." It is an allegory that describes the pain suffered by the family of those killed in war during the season surrounding Thanksgiving. The poem was turned into song by George Frederick Root, who was living in Chicago and wrote other songs of the Civil War era, including "The Battle Cry of Freedom", "Tramp! Tramp! Tramp!", read the poem, and decided to put it to music without consulting Washburnthe poem was not copyrighted. The song was released in 1862 and became very popular in the South and North.

See also 
 Life's Railway to Heaven  
 Eliza R. Snow ("Truth Reflects upon Our Senses")

References

Bibliography

Further reading
 Byron Farwell (1990), Ball's Bluff:  A Small Battle and Its Long Shadow, McLean, VA:  EPM Publications,  .  
 Kim Bernard Holien (1995), Battle at Ball's Bluff, Third Edition, Orange, VA:  Publisher's Press,  .  
 James A. Morgan, III (2004), A Little Short of Boats:  The Fights at Ball's Bluff and Edwards Ferry, October 21–22, 1861—A History and Tour Guide,  Fort Mitchell, KY:  Ironclad,  .

External links
 Our Noble Willie
 The Recovery of Lt. Grout's Body

1862 songs
1861 poems